House Party is a 1990 American comedy film directed by Reginald Hudlin. It stars Christopher "Kid" Reid and Christopher "Play" Martin of the hip hop duo Kid 'n Play, and also stars Paul Anthony, Bow-Legged Lou and B-Fine from Full Force, and Robin Harris (who died of a heart attack nine days after the film was released, making House Party his final acting role). The film also stars Martin Lawrence, Tisha Campbell, A.J. Johnson, Daryl "Chill" Mitchell and Gene "Groove" Allen (of Groove B. Chill), Kelly Jo Minter, John Witherspoon, with a cameo by funk musician George Clinton.

The film was written and directed by Reginald Hudlin, based on his award-winning Harvard University student film. The film grossed over $26 million in its run at the box office with its widest release being 700 theaters. The film has since become a cult classic. Upon its initial release, the film garnered critical acclaim.

The lead roles were originally written for DJ Jazzy Jeff & The Fresh Prince.

In 2022, the film was selected for preservation in the United States National Film Registry by the Library of Congress as being "culturally, historically, or aesthetically significant".

Plot 
In their high-school cafeteria, Peter, also known as "Play", announces to his friends, Christopher aka "Kid" Robinson Jr. and Bilal, that he will be having a party at his house that night, as his parents are on vacation. The reluctant Bilal is to be the DJ. Then, Kid is involved in an altercation with school bully Stab and his two brothers, Pee-Wee and Zilla. When Kid comes home, he tries to convince his father, "Pop" to let him go to the party. Pop relents at first, but, when a note from school informs him of the fight, he punishes Kid by disallowing him from going to the party. Rather than miss the party of the year, Kid sneaks out while Pop is sleeping in front of Dolemite – but the door closing behind Kid awakens Pop. On his way to the party, Kid is stopped by the neighborhood police and runs into Stab and his brothers, jumps over a fence where a fat man named Roughouse is having sex with his lady. Kid, along with Stab, Zilla, and Pee-Wee, are spotted and are shot at by Roughouse. Kid ducks into a nearby Alpha Delta Sigma reunion to escape them.

Crashing the reunion, Kid has the DJ scratch and mix a few of his old doo wop records so that he can liven the party with a rap, until Stab and the others arrive. Trying to escape from Stab, Kid accidentally knocks down an older man. Kid and the bullies are caught by the neighborhood police, who humiliate the four teenagers before letting them go. Kid's father is stopped and harassed by the police while walking trying to find him.

The party is in full swing when Kid finally arrives. During the party, Chill bumps the DJ table which angers Bilal and the rest of the guests and it nearly results in a fight between the two. Soon, Kid and Play get into a dance contest with attractive girls Sydney and Sharane (originally it was Kid and Groove against Sydney and Sharane but Groove gets drunk and passes out resulting in Play taking his place), then have a quick freestyle battle. Stab and his friends attempt to crash the party, but are arrested a second time by the policemen for attempting to burn the house down, who take delight in the prospect of beating them up. Eventually, Kid's father makes his way to the party, demanding to know where Kid is (upstairs helping Sharane get her coat) and, not finding him, Pop vows to wait for him at home. Play is later seen with Chill carrying a drunk Groove home.

Play stops the party because his bathroom toilet was broken by party members. Although Kid and Sydney have eyes for each other, Sharane decides to flirt with Kid openly, much to Sydney's disgust. Soon, the three leave the party, but, when Kid tries to make advances on Sharane, she rebuffs him. Then, Kid walks Sydney back home, and, after some argument, the pair finally calm down and talk quietly.

Sydney allows Kid to sneak into her house, and the two are about to have sex in Sydney's room when she stops him, wanting to know if she is simply his second choice. Kid admits that Sydney was his first choice all along, but they do not do anything when they see that the only condom Kid has is too old to be used. When Sydney's parents come home – now revealed as one of the couples at the high-school reunion, including the man Kid ran into – Sydney hastily helps Kid sneak out of the house.

He manages to get out of yet another scrape with Stab and his brothers, and they all end up in a jail cell. The men tell Kid what they're in jail for and Kid entertains the rest of the men in the cell by rapping, distracting them long enough for Play, Sharane, Bilal, and Sydney to arrive with enough cash to bail him out. Later, the five friends say their goodnights. Kid and Sydney share a long passionate kiss goodnight. After Play and Bilal drop him off, Kid sneaks in the house and gets undressed. As he is about to get into bed, he looks up to find Pop holding a belt. Pop tells him "I wouldn't do that just yet", snaps his belt, and says "cause your ass is mine". As the credits roll, we can hear Pop hitting Kid with the belt. (Kid yelping with each hit) during the credits.

At the very beginning of the movie, kids are seen dancing inside of a house with the noise being so loud that it literally blows the roof off of the house. During the credit roll, the same roof flies and lands on top of the policemen in a parking lot.

Cast 
Christopher "Kid" Reid as Christopher "Kid" Robinson Jr.
 Robin Harris as Christopher "Pop" Robinson Sr. 
 Christopher "Play" Martin as Peter "Play" Martin 
 Martin Lawrence as Bilal
 "Paul Anthony" George as Stab
 Lucien "Bow-Legged Lou" George Jr. as Pee-Wee
 Brian "B-Fine" George as Zilla
 Tisha Campbell as Sydney
 A.J. Johnson as Sharane
 Gene "Groove" Allen (of Groove B. Chill) as Groove
 Daryl "Chill" Mitchell (of Groove B. Chill) as Chill
 Belal "DJ Belal" Miller (of Groove B. Chill) as Herman
 Lou B. Washington as Otis
 Kelly Jo Minter as LaDonna
 John Witherspoon as Mr. Strickland
 Bebe Drake as Mrs. Strickland
 Clifton Powell as Sharane's Brother
 Verda Bridges as Sharane's Sister
 Desi Arnez Hines II as Peanut
 George Clinton as a DJ
 Barry Diamond as Cop #1
 Michael Pniewski as Cop #2
 Norma Donaldson as Mildred
 Shaun Baker as Clint
 Anthony Johnson as E.Z.E.
 Cliff Frazier as Brutus
 Jaime Cardriche as Tattoo
 Ronn Riser as Boy in the Bathroom #1
 Bentley Kyle Evans as Boy in the Bathroom #2
 Reginald Hudlin as Burglar #1 (Director's Cameo)
 Warrington Hudlin as Burglar #2 (Producer's Cameo)

Music

Soundtrack 

A soundtrack containing hip hop and R&B music was released on March 9, 1990, by Motown Records. It peaked at 104 on the Billboard 200 and 20 on the Top R&B/Hip-Hop Albums.

Reception 
House Party was met with critical acclaim. On Rotten Tomatoes, the film has a 94% approval rating based on 31 reviews, with an average rating of 7/10. The website's critical consensus reads, "House Party is a light, entertaining teen comedy with an infectious energy." On Metacritic, the film has a weighted average score of 76 out of 100, based on 15 critics, indicating "generally favorable reviews".

Roger Ebert of the Chicago Sun-Times gave it three out of four stars and commended its "energy and exuberance". He called the film "wall-to-wall with exuberant song and dance" and stated, "the musical is a canvas used by the director, Reginald Hudlin, to show us black teenagers with a freshness and originality that's rare in modern movies".

Sequels 

The film was a popular success, and two sequels were made: House Party 2 in 1991; and House Party 3 in 1994. House Party 2 features Lawrence and Campbell reprising their roles from the first film; the two would begin starring in the TV sitcom Martin the following year. House Party 3 features hip hop/R&B groups TLC and Immature in supporting roles. In 2001, Immature (now going by IMx) starred in a direct-to-video sequel, House Party 4: Down to the Last Minute, which does not feature any of the original cast from the other three films. A fifth installment and direct follow-up to the third film, titled House Party: Tonight's the Night was filmed in 2012 with Tequan Richmond, Zac Goodman, Tristin Mays, Alex McGregor, Rolonda Watts and Gary Anthony Williams. The film was a direct to DVD release in 2013, and also marked the return of Kid 'n Play to the series.

In 2018, it was announced that basketball star LeBron James, along with his SpringHill Entertainment partner Maverick Carter would be producing a new House Party film with Stephen Glover and Jamal Olori writing the screenplay. "This is definitely not a reboot. It’s an entirely new look for a classic movie. Everyone I grew up with loved House Party. To partner with this creative team to bring a new House Party to a new generation is unbelievable. Listen, it's fun, it's an honor when I got the opportunity to produce it, reboot the whole movie, man, I had so much fun as a kid watching that movie," James said. It is currently unknown if Kid 'n Play will appear in the film; however, rapper Drake could possibly appear along with a cameo by James. "We’re trying out some ideas for musicians to be cast in and to be a part of the project," Carter said. Los Angeles filmmaker Calmatic, known for directing "Old Town Road", was tapped to direct in 2019. In April 2021, Jorge Lendeborg Jr. and Tosin Cole were cast in the lead roles. This would be SpringHill's last feature film. On July 28, 2021, Jacob Latimore was cast to replace Lendeborg Jr., who dropped out of the film due to his mental well-being.

In 2022, the film was selected for preservation in the United States National Film Registry by the Library of Congress as being "culturally, historically, or aesthetically significant".

See also 
 List of hood films

References

External links 
 
 
 
 

House Party films
1990 films
1990 independent films
1990s buddy comedy films
1990 romantic comedy films
1990s musical comedy films
1990s teen comedy films
1990s teen romance films
African-American films
American buddy comedy films
American coming-of-age films
American independent films
American musical comedy films
American romantic comedy films
American romantic musical films
American teen comedy films
American teen romance films
New Line Cinema films
United States National Film Registry films
Films about parties
Films directed by Reginald Hudlin
1990s hip hop films
Sundance Film Festival award winners
1990 directorial debut films
1990s English-language films
1990s American films